Hyrynjärvi is a medium-sized lake of Finland. It is situated in Kainuu region and in Hyrynsalmi municipality. Vuorisaari island, about 30 meters high, is located in the lake, being famous place, including signs from Stone Age.

References

Nature of Hyrynsalmi
Lakes of Hyrynjärvi